Lori Ann Lindsey (born March 19, 1980) is a retired American soccer midfielder who last played for Canberra United in the Australian W-League and was also a member of the United States women's national soccer team player pool. She played one match in the 2011 FIFA Women's World Cup in Germany and was named an alternate for the 2012 Olympics in London.

Lindsey previously played for the Washington Freedom in the WUSA, the Washington Freedom and Philadelphia Independence  in the WPS, the Western New York Flash of WPSL Elite League  and the Washington Spirit in the NWSL.

Her nickname on the United States women's national soccer team was Lightning.

Early life
Lindsey grew up in Indianapolis, Indiana. She is the daughter of Larry and Carol Lindsey. A graduate of Pike High School, she was named NSCAA Parade All-American and earned first team All-State honors four consecutive years. Upon graduating, she was the all-time leading prep scorer in Indiana high school history. During high school, Lindsey refereed the indoor soccer games of national teammate Lauren Holiday ( Cheney).

University of Virginia
Lindsey played at the University of Virginia from 1998 to 2001 and was the school's first-ever Atlantic Coast Conference Player of the Year, winning the award two consecutive years (2000 & 2001) joining Mia Hamm as the only other player to achieve that distinction.  She finished sixth all-time scorer in UVA history with 33 goals and 76 points and was named NSCAA Second-Team All-American in 2001 and Third-Team All-American in 2000. She was also a 2001 finalist for the M.A.C. Award. Lindsey was named Female Athlete of the Year at UVA for the 2001–02 academic year.

Club career

Lindsey played for the Indiana Blaze of the W-League from 1997 to 2000. In 2002, she was the fourth overall pick in the WUSA draft by the San Diego Spirit. She played in 20 games, starting 13 and scored two goals with five assists. She was traded to the Washington Freedom during the 2003 WUSA Draft and was a member of 2003 Founders Cup III Champions.

Lindsey was a member of the 2007 W-League champions with the Washington Freedom.

In 2009, she played for the Washington Freedom in the inaugural season of the WPS after being taken 17th overall by the Freedom in the WPS General Draft. She started 18 of the 19 games she played for the Freedom, scoring two goals with one assist.

She was the first player taken in the WPS Expansion Draft by the Philadelphia Independence, and played with the club for two seasons (2010, 2011).

Lindsey played for the Western New York Flash during the 2012 season.

In January 2013 Lindsey was allocated to the Washington Spirit in the newly formed National Women's Soccer League. She started 21 games and captained the team in 2013. Following the 2013 NWSL season, she went on loan to Canberra United in the W-League.

In 2014 Lindsey played in 22 games for the Spirit. After the NWSL season, she again went on loan to Canberra United. Canberra won the 2014 W-League Championship by defeating Perth Glory in the Grand Final.

Lindsey announced in August 2014 that she would be retiring at the end of the year.

On April 24, 2017 it was announced that Lindsey would join the staff of the Washington Spirit Development Academy as the Strength and Conditioning Director and Assistant Coach.

In 2018 Lindsey served as a commentator for non-televised NWSL games that were broadcast on go90 and the NWSL website.

Nashville SC in 2020 announced Lindsey would serve as its sideline reporter. As of 2023, she is one of the match analysts for MLS Season Pass on Apple TV.

International career

Lindsey played for the U.S. U-16, U-17 and U-21 teams and was a member of the USA's U-21 2001 Nordic Cup champions in Norway.

Lindsey was called into national team training camps in 2009 and 2010 and was in Residency Training Camp at the Home Depot Center in 2004 and 2006. She played one match in the 2011 FIFA Women's World Cup in Germany against Colombia which the U.S. won 3–0. She has been described as one of the best possessors of the ball on the U.S. team and is known for her excellent work rate, superb passing, and willingness to sacrifice for the team. As a central midfielder, she led the team in assists in 2010 with seven.

Lori Lindsey was a member of the 2012 U.S. Women's National Team player pool and was named as an alternate for the 2012 Olympics in London.

Lindsey was nominated for the National Soccer Hall of Fame class of 2018.

Career statistics

International goals

Personal life
Lindsey resides in Washington, D.C. She came out publicly as gay in 2012 in an interview with Autostraddle, but notes her sexuality has never been in question to friends and family.

References

External links

 US Soccer player profile
 Washington Spirit player profile
 Washington Freedom (WPS) player profile
 Washington Freedom (WUSA) player profile
 Virginia coaching profile
 

1980 births
Living people
Soccer players from Indianapolis
American women's soccer players
Parade High School All-Americans (girls' soccer)
San Diego Spirit players
Virginia Cavaliers women's soccer players
Washington Freedom players
Philadelphia Independence players
United States women's international soccer players
2011 FIFA Women's World Cup players
Lesbian sportswomen
LGBT association football players
National Women's Soccer League players
Washington Spirit players
Canberra United FC players
LGBT people from Indiana
American LGBT sportspeople
Women's association football midfielders
Pan American Games medalists in football
Footballers at the 1999 Pan American Games
Pan American Games gold medalists for the United States
Medalists at the 1999 Pan American Games
American soccer commentators
Association football commentators
Women's Professional Soccer players
Women's United Soccer Association players